The Cheshire archers were a body of elite soldiers noted for their skills with the longbow that fought in many engagements in England and France in the Middle Ages. Battles at which there were sizeable numbers of Cheshire archers include Agincourt and Crecy. Richard II employed a bodyguard of these yeoman archers who came from the Macclesfield Hundred and the forest districts of Cheshire.

References

Military_history_of_Cheshire